Bethpage may refer to:

Bethphage, a place in ancient Israel, mentioned as the place from which Jesus sent the disciples to find a donkey and a colt, which he would ride into Jerusalem
Bethpage, Missouri, an unincorporated community
Bethpage, New York, a hamlet located on Long Island within the Town of Oyster Bay in Nassau County, New York, United States
Old Bethpage, New York, a hamlet on Long Island, formerly called Bethpage
Bethpage State Park, a park on Long Island with five golf courses, including the 
 Bethpage Black Course, Long Island, hosted the 2002 and 2009 U.S. Open Golf Championships
Bethpage Ballpark, a baseball park in Central Islip, New York that serves as the home of the Long Island Ducks
Bethpage (LIRR station), on the Main Line of the Long Island Rail Road
Bethpage, Tennessee, an unincorporated community in Sumner County, Tennessee, United States
Bethpage Federal Credit Union, an American financial institution